Francis Hillmeyer (born September 9, 1946 in Mulhouse, Haut-Rhin) is a member of the National Assembly of France.  He represents the Haut-Rhin department,  and is a member of the New Centre.

References

1946 births
Living people
Politicians from Mulhouse
Union for French Democracy politicians
The Centrists politicians
Deputies of the 12th National Assembly of the French Fifth Republic
Deputies of the 13th National Assembly of the French Fifth Republic
Deputies of the 14th National Assembly of the French Fifth Republic
Union of Democrats and Independents politicians